à gogo is singer-songwriter Patty Larkin's eighth album, her second live album, and her first on her label Vanguard. Produced by Larkin and Bette Warner in 1999, it contained the following performances:

Track listing
All songs were written by Patty Larkin except "Banish Misfortune" (traditional, arr. by Richard Thompson) and "Don't Do It" (William Stevenson).

 "Wolf at the Door"
 "Banish Misfortune/Open Hand"
 "Tango"
 "Do Not Disturb"
 "Don't"
 "Dear Diary"
 "I Told Him That My Dog Wouldn't Run"
 "Booth of Glass"
 "Who Holds Your Hand"
 "The Book I'm Not Reading"
 "Don't Do It"
 "Mary Magdalene"
 "Me and That Train"
 "Good Thing"

Album Personnel
  Patty Larkin – vocals and acoustic guitar

References

Patty Larkin albums
1999 live albums
Vanguard Records live albums